The 1921 Tennessee Volunteers football team (variously "Tennessee", "UT" or the "Vols") represented the University of Tennessee in the 1921 college football season. Playing as a member of the Southern Intercollegiate Athletic Association (SIAA), the team was led by head coach M. B. Banks, in his first year, and played their home games at Shields–Watkins Field in Knoxville, Tennessee. They finished the season with a record of six wins, two losses and one tie (6–2–1 overall, 4–1–1 in the SIAA). The Volunteers offense scored 102 points while the defense allowed 35 points.

Schedule

References

Tennessee
Tennessee Volunteers football seasons
Tennessee Volunteers football